Meffert is a German surname. Notable people with the surname include:

Chris Meffert, American politician
Dominik Meffert, German tennis player
Greg Meffert, New Orleans technology chief
Jim Meffert, Minnesota politician and executive
Uwe Mèffert, German designer of mechanical puzzles
William C. Meffert (1842–1918), American politician in Wisconsin

German-language surnames